Letter Exchange is a professional organization dedicated to the promotion of lettering in all media. Letter Exchange was founded in the United Kingdom in 1988. It organizes lectures held at the Art Workers Guild, publishes its journal Forum twice a year, and also organizes exhibitions. Its international membership is open to professionals as well as interested amateurs.

See also
Calligraphy
Lettering
Typography

References

External links
 letterexchange.org

Calligraphy organizations, societies, and schools
Organizations established in 1988
1988 establishments in the United Kingdom